Nosotras las mujeres (English title: We the women) is a Mexican telenovela produced by Patricia Lozano for Televisa in 1981. It starred by Silvia Derbez, Beatriz Sheridan, Martha Roth, Sonia Furió, Anita Blanch and Fernando Larrañaga.

Cast 

Silvia Derbez as Alma
Beatriz Sheridan as Edna
Martha Roth as Monica
Sonia Furió as Ivonne
Anita Blanch as Beatriz
Fernando Larrañaga as ManuelEduardo Noriega as AgustinMaría Rojo as AnaClaudio Obregon as Luis MarianoSergio Jimenez as MaxQueta Lavat as AidaAdriana Parra as EstelaLourdes Canale as MariaAlejandro Tamayo as Felipe
Pablo Ferrel as Emilio
Alberto Inzua as Antonio
Maria Fernanda Ayensa as Alicia
Esteban Siller as Salomon
Magda Rodriguez as Malena
Ismael Aguilar as Mario
Myrrah Saavedra as Elizabeth
Rebeca Rambal as Marcela
Gilberto Gil as Miguel
Gerardo Paz as Eduardo
Patricia Renteria as Rosa
Jose Luis Padilla as Ramon
Eric del Castillo as Manuel
Javier Marc as Maximiliano
Enrique Ortiz as Ernesto
Claudia Guzmán as Elisa

References

External links 
 

Mexican telenovelas
1981 telenovelas
Televisa telenovelas
Spanish-language telenovelas
1981 Mexican television series debuts
1981 Mexican television series endings